Suramphaa (1641–1644) was a king of the Ahom kingdom.  Due to his moral disposition, which was severely lacking, he is referred to as the bhoga roja in the Buranjis.

Accession and decline
Suramphaa, one of the three eligible sons of the previous Ahom king, Susenghphaa (Pratap Singha), acceded the Ahom throne in alliance with Sutingphaa against Sai, both of whom were his brothers.  Due to his scandalous life, as well as the depredations of an adopted son who he announced as heir apparent, the Ahom nobles deposed and poisoned him and installed Sutingphaa as the king.

Notes

References

 

Ahom kings
Ahom kingdom

1640s deaths
Year of birth unknown

Year of death uncertain